The 2004–05 Kentucky Wildcats men's basketball team represented University of Kentucky. The head coach was Tubby Smith. The team was a member of the Southeast Conference and played their home games at Rupp Arena.

Roster

Schedule and results

|-
!colspan=9 style="background:#273BE2; color:white;"| Non-conference regular season

|-
!colspan=9 style="background:#273BE2; color:white;"| SEC Regular Season

|-
!colspan=9 style="background:#273BE2;"| 2005 SEC Tournament

|-
!colspan=9 style="background:#273BE2;"| 2005 NCAA Tournament

References

Kentucky Wildcats men's basketball seasons
Kentucky
Wild
Wild
Kentucky